Soft Machine are  a British rock band from Canterbury formed in mid-1966 by Mike Ratledge (keyboards, 1966–1976), Robert Wyatt (drums, vocals, 1966–1971), Kevin Ayers (bass, guitar, vocals, 1966–1968) and Daevid Allen (guitar, backing vocals, bass 1966–1967). As a central band of the Canterbury scene, the group became one of the first British psychedelic acts and later moved into progressive rock and jazz fusion. Their varying line-ups have included former members such as Andy Summers (guitar, 1968), Hugh Hopper (bass, 1968–1973), Elton Dean (saxophone 1969–1972), John Marshall (drums, 1972–1978, 1980–1981, 1984, 2015–2023), Karl Jenkins (keyboards, saxophone, 1972–1978, 1980–1981, 1984), Roy Babbington (bass, 1973–1976, 2015–2020) and Allan Holdsworth (guitar, 1973–1975), and currently consists of John Etheridge (guitar, 1975–1978, 1984 and since 2015), Theo Travis (saxophone, flutes, keyboards since 2015), Fred Thelonious Baker (bass since 2020), and Asaf Sirkis (drums since 2023).

Though they achieved little commercial success, the Soft Machine are considered by critics to have been influential in rock music. Dave Lynch at AllMusic called them "one of the more influential bands of their era, and certainly one of the most influential underground ones". The group were named after the novel The Soft Machine by William S. Burroughs.

History

1960s (1966–69)
Soft Machine (billed as The Soft Machine up to 1969 or 1970) were formed in mid-1966 by Robert Wyatt (drums, vocals), Kevin Ayers (bass, guitar, vocals), Daevid Allen (guitar) and Mike Ratledge (organ). Allen, Wyatt and future bassist Hugh Hopper first played together in the Daevid Allen Trio in 1963, occasionally accompanied by Ratledge. Wyatt, Ayers, and Hopper had been founding members of The Wilde Flowers, incarnations of which would also include future members of another Canterbury band, Caravan.

This first Soft Machine line-up became involved in the early UK underground, performing at the UFO Club and other London clubs like the Speakeasy Club and Middle Earth. According to Wyatt, the negative reactions the Soft Machine received when playing at venues other than these underground clubs were what led to their penchant for long tracks and segued tunes, since playing continuously left their audiences no chance to boo. Their first single, "Love Makes Sweet Music" (recorded 5 February 1967, produced by Chas Chandler), was released by Polydor in February, backed with "Feelin' Reelin' Squeelin (January 1967, produced by Kim Fowley). It was a commercial flop. In April 1967 they recorded nine demo songs with producer Giorgio Gomelsky in De Lane Lea Studios that remained unreleased until 1971 in a dispute over studio costs. They also played in the Netherlands, Germany, and on the French Riviera. During July and August 1967, Gomelsky booked shows along the Côte d'Azur with the band's most famous early gig taking place in the village square of Saint-Tropez. This led to an invitation to perform at producer Eddie Barclay's trendy "Nuit Psychédélique", performing a forty-minute rendering of "We Did It Again", singing the refrain over and over in a trance-like quality. This made them instant darlings of the Parisian "in" crowd, resulting in invitations to appear on television shows and at the Paris Biennale in October 1967. When returning from France, Allen (an Australian) was denied re-entry to the United Kingdom, so the group continued as a trio, while he returned to Paris to form Gong.

Sharing the same management as Jimi Hendrix, the band supported The Jimi Hendrix Experience's North America tour throughout 1968. Soft Machine's first album was recorded in New York City in April at the end of the first leg of the tour. Back in London, guitarist Andy Summers, later of The Police, joined the group following the breakup of Dantalian's Chariot. After a few weeks of rehearsals, the quartet began a tour of the U.S. with some solo shows before reuniting with Hendrix during August and September 1968. Summers was fired at the insistence of Ayers. Ayers departed amicably after the final tour date at the Hollywood Bowl in mid-September, and Soft Machine disbanded. Wyatt stayed in the U.S. to record solo demos, while Ratledge returned to London and began composing in earnest. One of Wyatt's demos, Slow Walkin' Talk, allowed Wyatt to make use of his multi-instrumentalist skills (Hammond organ, piano, drums and vocals) and featured Hendrix on bass guitar.

In December 1968, to fulfill contractual obligations, Soft Machine re-formed with former road manager and composer Hugh Hopper on bass added to Wyatt and Ratledge and recorded their second album, Volume Two (1969), which started a transition toward jazz fusion. In May 1969 this line-up acted as the uncredited backing band on two tracks of The Madcap Laughs, the debut solo album by Syd Barrett. In October 1969 the band became a septet with the addition of four horn players, saxophonists Elton Dean and Lyn Dobson, cornet player Mark Charig and trombonist Nick Evans, though the latter two departed after two months.

1970s (1970–78)

The resulting Soft Machine quintet (Wyatt, Hopper, Ratledge, Dean and Dobson) continued until March 1970, when Dobson departed. The remaining quartet recorded Third (1970) and Fourth (1971). Fourth was the first of their fully instrumental albums and the last one featuring Wyatt.

Their propensity for building extended suites from regular-sized compositions, both live and in the studio (already in the Ayers suite in their first album), reached its apogee in the 1970 album Third, unusual for its time with each of the four sides featuring one suite. Third was also unusual for remaining in print for more than ten years in the U.S., and is the best-selling Soft Machine recording.

They received unprecedented acclaim across Europe, and they made history by becoming the first rock band invited to play at London's Proms in August 1970. The show was broadcast live on national TV and later appeared as a live album.

After differences over the group's musical direction, Wyatt left (or was fired from) the band in August 1971 and formed Matching Mole (a pun on machine molle, French for soft machine; also said at the time to have been taken from stage lighting equipment "Matching Mole"). He was briefly replaced by Australian drummer Phil Howard. This line-up toured extensively in Europe during the end of 1971 (attested by the 2008 release, Drop) and began the recording of their next album, but further musical disagreements led to Howard's dismissal after the recording of the first LP side of Fifth (1972) at the beginning of 1972, with the second LP side recorded with his replacement, John Marshall. Later in 1972, Dean left the band, and was replaced by Karl Jenkins, who also played keyboards in addition to saxophone. Both Marshall and Jenkins were former members of Ian Carr's Nucleus, and the band's next album, Six (1973), saw their sound develop even more towards jazz fusion.

After the release of Six in 1973, Hopper left the band. He was replaced by Roy Babbington, another former Nucleus member, who played 6-string bass guitar, while Karl Jenkins took over as bandleader and composer. After they released Seven (1973), the band switched record labels from Columbia to Harvest. On their 1975 album, Bundles, a significant musical change occurred with Allan Holdsworth adding guitar as a prominent melody instrument to the band's sound, sometimes reminiscent of John McLaughlin's Mahavishnu Orchestra, setting the album apart from previous Soft Machine albums which had rarely featured guitars. Holdsworth was replaced by John Etheridge in 1975, while Ratledge, the last remaining original member of the band, left in early 1976. After his departure, saxophonist Alan Wakeman was recruited. Wakeman's time was the band was brief, but did record with them on the next album Softs (1976). Other musicians in the band during the later period were bassists Percy Jones (of Brand X) and Steve Cook, saxophonist Ray Warleigh and violinist Ric Sanders. Their 1977 performances and record (titled Alive and Well, ironically) were among the last for Soft Machine as a working band, their last performance (until the 1984 reformation) being the only Soft Machine concert of 1978, at the Sound & Musik Festival in Dortmund, Germany on 8 December.

1980s reunions (1980–81; 1984)
The Soft Machine name was resurrected for the 1981 record Land of Cockayne. Soft Machine also briefly reformed for a series of dates at London's Ronnie Scott's Jazz Club in the summer of 1984, featuring John Marshall, Karl Jenkins, John Etheridge, Ray Warleigh, bassist Paul Carmichael and pianist Dave MacRae.

Alternative bands (1978–2015)

Soft Heap / Soft Head (1978–88)
Soft Heap (Hugh, Elton, Alan, Pip) formed in January 1978, featuring Hugh Hopper and Elton Dean from Soft Machine, and Alan Gowen and Pip Pyle from the band National Health. The newly formed band toured in the spring and summer of 1978 as Soft Head as Dave Sheen replaced Pip Pyle, due to the latter's commitments with the band National Health. The live album Rogue Element was recorded on that tour and was released in 1978.

The original Soft Heap line-up reconvened in October 1978 to record their eponymous studio album Soft Heap which was released in 1979.

After two line-up changes that occurred in 1979–81, the new line-up toured intermittently throughout the 1980s, embarking on four tours during the decade with a total of 25 European concerts, culminating with a gig on 11 May 1988 at the Festival "Jazz sous les pommiers" in Coutances, France.

Soft Ware (1999–2002), Soft Works (2002–04), Soft Mountain (2003) and Soft Bounds (2004)
Soft Ware (sometimes SoftWhere) formed in September 1999, featuring Elton Dean, Hugh Hopper, John Marshall (on drums) and longtime friend Keith Tippett. This line-up would remain together only briefly, and played just a single gig (Augustusburg Hunting Lodge, Germany, Sept. 4, 1999). Then in 2002, with Tippett unavailable, another former Soft Machine member, Allan Holdsworth (on guitar), was brought in with the remaining three members of Soft Ware, who renamed themselves Soft Works in June 2002 to avoid confusion with Peter Mergener's band Software. As Soft Works, they made their world live debut on 17 August 2002 at the Progman Cometh Festival (at the Moore Theater in Seattle, Washington), released (on 29 July 2003) their only (studio) album, Abracadabra, consisting of all new material recorded at the Eastcote Studios in London on 5–7 June 2002, and toured Japan in August 2003, Italy in January and February 2004, and Mexico in March 2004.

During a Japanese Soft Works tour in August 2003, Elton Dean (on saxophone) and Hugh Hopper (on bass) formed the (very) short-lived band Soft Mountain along with Japanese musicians Hoppy Kamiyama (on keyboards, whose name translates as "God Mountain"), whom Hopper had met a couple of years earlier, and Yoshida Tatsuya (from the band Ruins) on drums. Indeed, looking for a break from relatively fixed set lists and song forms, Hugh Hopper had contacted Kamiyama with the idea of hitting a studio for a day to see what might happen. Kamiyama brought in Tatsuya, and, with no discussion, the quartet dove right in, playing two 45-minute improvisations. In 2007, a year after Elton Dean unexpectedly passed at the age of sixty, the one-time meeting band released their eponymous album Soft Mountain that they had recorded on that 10 August 2003 day in Tokyo, Japan. The two-part "Soft Mountain Suite" extracts the best thirty minutes from each improvisation. Soft Mountain named themselves after Hoppy Kamiyama, whose name translates to "God Mountain" in English.

In June 2004, Elton Dean and Hugh Hopper formed the (very) short-lived band Soft Bounds along with Sophia Domancich (keyboards) and Simon Goubert (drums), playing at the Festival "Les Tritonales" at Le Triton in Les Lilas, France (a suburb in the northeast of Paris). This concert was partially released as the (unique Soft Bounds) album Live at Le Triton in 2005.

Soft Machine Legacy (2004–15)
In October 2004, a new variant of Soft Works, with John Etheridge permanently replacing Holdsworth, took the name of "Soft Machine Legacy" and performed their first two gigs (two Festival shows on 9 October in Turkey and 15 October in Czech Republic), Liam Genockey temporarily replacing John Marshall who had ligament problems (the first Soft Machine Legacy line-up being consequently: Elton Dean, John Etheridge, Hugh Hopper and Liam Genockey). Later on, Soft Machine Legacy released three albums: Live in Zaandam (2005), the studio album Soft Machine Legacy (2006) recorded in September 2005 and featuring fresh material and the album Live at the New Morning (2006). After Elton Dean died in February 2006, the band continued with British saxophonist and flautist Theo Travis, formerly of Gong and The Tangent.

In December 2006, the new Legacy line-up recorded the album Steam in Jon Hiseman's studio. Steam was released in August 2007 by Moonjune before a European tour.

Hopper left in 2008 because he was suffering from leukaemia, so the band continued live performances with Fred Baker. Following Hopper's death in 2009, the band announced that they would continue with Roy Babbington again replacing Hugh Hopper on bass.

Soft Machine Legacy released their fifth album in October 2010: a 58-minute album entitled Live Adventures recorded live in October 2009 in Austria and Germany during a European tour.

Founding Soft Machine bassist Kevin Ayers died in February 2013, aged 68, while Daevid Allen died in March 2015 following a short battle with cancer, aged 77.

On 18 March 2013, the Legacy band released a new studio album, titled Burden of Proof. Travis stated that "legally we could actually be called Soft Machine but for various reasons it was decided to be one step removed."

A return to the name "Soft Machine" (2015–present) 
In September and October 2015, it was announced that the band Soft Machine Legacy (made of guitarist John Etheridge, drummer John Marshall, bass player Roy Babbington and sax, flute and keyboard player Theo Travis) would be performing under the name "Soft Machine" in late 2015 and early 2016: two shows in the Netherlands and Belgium in early December 2015 and a series of seven UK shows in March–April 2016.

In December 2015, it was confirmed that the band had dropped the "Legacy" tag from their name, as the band featured three of the group's 1970s members – John Etheridge, John Marshall and Roy Babbington – joined by Theo Travis on sax, flute and keyboard.

On 7 September 2018, Soft Machine released Hidden Details, their first new studio album in five years (first album as Soft Machine since 1981). In Fall and Winter 2018, they toured the world as part of their 50th anniversary celebration and in support of the new album, and the US in January and February 2019.

On 20 March 2020, Soft Machine released Live at The Baked Potato (on Tonefloat Records), their first original live album in decades. It was recorded live at The Baked Potato, Los Angeles, CA on 1 February 2019 and was initially only available as a twelve-track only-200-numbered-copy limited edition double vinyl LP; it has since been released on CD. The album documents their extensive 2018–2019 world tour.

Composed of John Etheridge (guitar), Theo Travis (saxophones, flutes, keyboards), Fred Thelonious Baker (bass) and Asaf Sirkis (drums) (the latter replacing newly retired John Marshall), Soft Machine are due to embark on 3 February 2023 at the New Cross Inn in London on a 7-date UK "Spring 2023 Tour" due to end on 26 May 2023 at City Varieties in Leeds. The band is also due to perform another show in Leeds on 7 November 2023 at Farsley Old Woollen.

Style
Soft Machine's music encompasses progressive rock, experimental rock, jazz rock, jazz, proto-prog, psychedelic rock and art rock, as well as being a part of the Canterbury scene of progressive rock. According to Hugh Hopper, "We weren't consciously playing jazz rock, it was more a case of not wanting to sound like other bands; we certainly didn't want a guitarist."

Members

Current members
John Etheridge – guitar 
Theo Travis – saxophones, flutes, keyboards, piano 
Fred Thelonious Baker – bass 
Asaf Sirkis – drums 

Former members
Mike Ratledge – keyboards, piano, organ, synthesizers, flute 
Robert Wyatt – drums, percussion, lead and backing vocals 
Kevin Ayers – bass, guitars, backing and lead vocals 
Daevid Allen – guitar, bass, backing vocals 
Andy Summers –  guitar 
Hugh Hopper – bass, guitars, alto saxophone 
Elton Dean – alto saxophone, saxello, flute, keyboards 
Lyn Dobson – tenor and soprano saxophones, flute, backing vocals 
Mark Charig – cornet, trumpet 
Nick Evans – trombone 
Phil Howard – drums 
John Marshall – drums, percussion 
Karl Jenkins – baritone and soprano saxophones, recorder, flute, oboe, keyboards, piano, synthesizers 
Roy Babbington – bass 
Allan Holdsworth – guitars, violin, voices 
Alan Wakeman – tenor and soprano saxophones 
Ray Warleigh – alto saxophone, flute 
Ric Sanders – violin 
Percy Jones – bass 
Steve Cook – bass 
Paul Carmichael – bass 
Dave MacRae – keyboards, piano

Discography

Studio albums

Live albums

Related bands, projects & tributes discography

Discography

Filmography
Soft Machine Legacy: New Morning – The Paris Concert, available in DVD format (2006)
Alive in Paris 1970, available in DVD format (2008)
Romantic Warriors III: Canterbury Tales, available in DVD format (2015)

Notes

References

Further reading
Bennett, Graham. Soft Machine: Out-Bloody-Rageous; London: SAF Publishing; 2005; ; Revised and updated edition: 2014;

External links
Official Website
Soft Machine section at the Canterbury Music website
Une discographie de Robert Wyatt (in French)
Soft Machine discography (archived)
Facelift Magazine, "exploring the Canterbury scene and beyond"
Softs in "The (almost) authorised Robert Wyatt website"
Elton Dean interview in Facelift Magazine
Noisette, "The ultimate Soft Machine experience, music, pictures, movies, facts"

Canterbury scene
Columbia Records artists
English progressive rock groups
English jazz-rock groups
Harvest Records artists
Musical groups established in 1966
Musical groups disestablished in 1984
1966 establishments in England
Articles which contain graphical timelines
Proto-prog musicians